Theodorus van Gogh (1 May 1857 – 25 January 1891) was a Dutch art dealer, the younger brother of Vincent van Gogh. Theo's unfailing financial and emotional support allowed his brother to devote himself entirely to painting. Theo died at the age of 33, six months after his brother died at the age of 37. At his death Theo owned practically all of his brother's artwork. Theo's widow Jo van Gogh-Bonger worked tirelessly to promote the work of Vincent and keep alive the memory of her husband. Theo made a significant impact on the art world as an art dealer, playing a crucial role in the introduction of contemporary Dutch and French art to the public. His widow was able to draw on the connections that Theo made to promote Vincent's work. In 1914, she reburied Theo's remains next to his brother Vincent's.

Early life

Theodorus "Theo" van Gogh was born on 1 May 1857 in the village of Groot-Zundert in the province of North Brabant, Netherlands.

He was the son of Theodorus van Gogh and Anna Cornelia Carbentus. His elder brother was artist Vincent van Gogh (1853–1890).

Business career
Theo worked for some years at the Dutch office of the Parisian art dealers Goupil & Cie in The Hague. Theo joined the Brussels office on 1 January 1873 as their youngest employee. After Theo was transferred to the London office, he moved to the office in The Hague, where he became a successful art dealer. By 1884, he was transferred to the Paris main office, which in 1884 took the name of Boussod & Valadon. Beginning in the winter of 1880–1881, he sent painting materials as well as monthly financial support to his brother, painter Vincent van Gogh, who was then living in the Netherlands.

Personal life
In Paris, Theo met Andries Bonger and his sister Johanna, known as Jo. He was quite taken with her and hoped to marry her. At the time, she was in a relationship she hoped would lead to marriage. When it did not, she reconsidered Theo's proposal. They married in Amsterdam on 17 April 1889. During their short engagement, they had an extensive correspondence, later published as Brief Happiness, in which they discussed practical matters or setting up married life together, but Theo also conveyed strength and the importance of his bond with Vincent. The couple moved to Paris, where their apartment became a venue for socializing with artists and members of the artistic community. Their son Vincent Willem was born in Paris on 31 January 1890. On 8 June, the family visited Vincent, who was living near Paris in Auvers-sur-Oise.

Vincent died in July 1890 at age 37. Theo suffered from dementia paralytica, now understood as late-stage neurosyphilis, and his health declined rapidly after Vincent's death. Weak and unable to come to terms with Vincent's absence, he died six months later (25 January 1891) at age 33 in Den Dolder.

Theo's great-grandson, also named Theo van Gogh, was a controversial film director, who was murdered on the streets of Amsterdam in 2004 by an Islamic extremist after making a short film critical of the treatment of women in Islamic culture.

Relationship with Vincent

Theo admired his elder brother Vincent for his whole life, but communicating with him proved to be difficult, even before Vincent opted to follow his artistic vocation. The communication between both brothers suffered from diverging definitions of standards, and it was evidently Theo who kept on writing letters. Vincent is known not to have kept the letters Theo sent; on the other hand, Theo kept every scrap of correspondence from his brother (651 letters addressed to Theo in total). Therefore, mostly Vincent's answers survived and few of Theo's (32 letters from Theo to Vincent remain). Theo was often concerned about Vincent's mental condition and he was amongst the few who understood his brother. It is known that Theo helped Vincent maintain his artist lifestyle by giving him money. He also helped Vincent pursue his life as an artist through his unwavering emotional support and love. The majority of Theo's letters and communications with Vincent are filled with praise and encouragement. Vincent would send Theo sketches and ideas for paintings, along with accounts of his day to day experiences, to the delight and eager attention of Theo.

Dealer and artist
While Theo is best known for being the brother of Vincent van Gogh and one of his major roles in art was his influence on Vincent's career, Theo himself made many important contributions. Theo played a vital role in the introduction of contemporary Dutch and French art to the public: Theo was instrumental in the popularity of Impressionist artists such as Claude Monet and Edgar Degas by persuading his employers, Goupil & Cie, to exhibit and buy their works.

In 1886, Theo invited Vincent to live with him in Paris, and from March they shared an apartment in Montmartre. Theo introduced Vincent to Paul Gauguin, Paul Cézanne, Henri de Toulouse-Lautrec, Henri Rousseau, Camille Pissarro and Georges Seurat, and in 1888 he persuaded Gauguin to join Vincent, who had moved to Arles. Theo not only conspired with Vincent as the liaison between Vincent and Gauguin, but was the deciding factor in his move to Arles seeing as it was Theo van Gogh who planned and eventually committed to supporting them both financially. He paid for living and professional expenses as well as for the travel expenses Gauguin accumulated to get from Pont Aven, Brittany, to Arles. Theo was equally the one with whom Gauguin communicated when his relationship with Vincent turned volatile and unmanageable, notably the severing of the ear fiasco. Theo was the source of stability and the intermediate between the two artists and allowed them to create prolifically for a couple of months (63 days); paintings that would otherwise not have survived.

Competing with Durant-Ruel and Georges Petit, the young dealer was to take over an important stake in this market. In 1888, he exhibited ten paintings by Monet from Antibes. Theo also had close relations with Pissarro, and in the Autumn 1888, he presented a few of the painter's latest works and in 1890 he devoted an exhibition to him. Degas allowed him to set up a small exhibition of his nudes in January 1888 and a year later an exhibition of a selection of his works. Theo was also interested in Sisley, Renoir, and other such "moderns" as Besnard, Carrière and Raffaëlli.

Correspondence

The two brothers maintained an intensive correspondence, with Theo often encouraging his depressed brother. Theo was one of the few people Vincent could talk to and confide in. These letters are one of the few sources of information about Vincent's life, providing detailed accounts of not only the occurrences but also the thoughts and feelings in his life. Over three-quarters of the more than 800 letters Vincent wrote were to Theo, including his first and his last.

It is largely thanks to Theo and his wife Johanna, who in 1914 decided to publish the letters between Theo and Vincent, that the letters are available. Hardly any of Theo's letters survive because Vincent failed to keep them. The two-year period in which Vincent and Theo lived together in the neighbourhood of Montmartre in Paris is also the least documented period of Vincent's artistic career because of the lack of letters. These letters witness both the emotional and professional state of Vincent throughout his life as early as 1874 and serve as a diary for his everyday encounters. The letters have been collected and published in book form as The Letters of Vincent van Gogh.

Film legacy
The van Gogh brothers' relationship figured in the Vincente Minnelli 1956 movie adaptation of Irving Stone's 1934 biographical novel Lust for Life. In it, Hollywood star Kirk Douglas played Vincent, and British actor James Donald appeared as Theo.

The family relationship was the more central subject in Robert Altman's movie Vincent & Theo (1990), starring British actors Tim Roth as Vincent and Paul Rhys as Theo.

The brothers' relationship is also featured in Maurice Pialat's 1991 film Van Gogh, with Jacques Dutronc playing Vincent and Bernard Le Coq as Theo.

The delivery of Vincent's final letter to Theo after Vincent's death and the circumstances surrounding his death was the subject of the 2017 film Loving Vincent, which was animated by oil paintings made with Van Gogh's techniques.

Julian Schnabel's meditation on Vincent's artistic life, At Eternity's Gate (2018), featured Willem Dafoe as Vincent and Rupert Friend as Theo.

Death

Theo's health was not robust when he married. In fact, he had been denied a life insurance policy because of it. It deteriorated significantly in the months after the death of his brother. He was admitted to the Willem Arntz Hospital, a psychiatric hospital, in Den Dolder on 18 November 1890. He had been diagnosed in Paris as suffering from a progressive and general paralysis. Initial examination confirmed this diagnosis. By 1 December his medical notes confirmed he presented all the symptoms of dementia paralytica, a disease of the brain caused by syphilis. He died on 25 January 1891. The cause of death was listed as dementia paralytica caused by "heredity, chronic disease, overwork, sadness". 

In 1914, Theo's body was exhumed from his resting place in Utrecht, Netherlands, and reburied with his brother at Auvers-sur-Oise at the wish of his widow, Jo, so the brothers could "lie together eternally". By doing that, she also guaranteed that those visiting the grave of the by now well known artist would be aware of Theo's closeness to his older brother in life.

See also
 Van Gogh's family in his art
 Johanna van Gogh-Bonger

Notes

References

Further reading

Anonymous (initialled "H.H.H." and "W.F.d.C.H."): Van Gogh, 's-Gravenhage, Nederland's Patriciaat 50, 1964, pp. 171–183.
Hulsker, Jan: Vincent and Theo van Gogh: A Dual Biography, Ann Arbor, Fuller Publications, 1990. .
Jansen, Leo, and Jan Robert: Kort geluk. De briefwisseling tussen Theo van Gogh en Jo Bonger, Waanders, Zwolle 1999.  (also available in English).
Luijten, Hans. Jo van Gogh-Bonger: The Woman Who Made Vincent Famous. London: Bloomsbury Visual Arts 2022. 
Rewald, John: Theo van Gogh, Goupil, and the Impressionists, Gazette des Beaux-Arts, January & February 1973, pp. 1–107; reprinted in Rewald, John: Studies in Post-Impressionism, Thames and Hudson, 1986, pp. 7–115 (no ISBN).
 Irene Meyjes, Johanna van Gogh-Bonger: kunsthandelaar?, Uitgeverij Scriptio, Deventer, 2007, 
 Stolwijk, Chris & Han Veenenbos, The accountbook of Theo van Gogh and Jo van Gogh-Bonger, Van Gogh Museum Amsterdam 2002, 
Stolwijk, Chris, & Thomson, Richard: Theo van Gogh 1857–1891: Art dealer, collector
Van Gogh, Theo, Johanna van Gogh-Bonger, and Han van Crimpen. Brief Happiness: The Correspondence of Theo Van Gogh and Jo Bonger. W Books 2000. 
John Lichfield, "Van Gogh's little brother goes on show", 1999, The Independent, retrieved 27 January 2009

1857 births
1891 deaths
Dutch art dealers
Dutch expatriates in France
People from Zundert
Theo
People of Montmartre
Burials in Île-de-France
Patrons of the visual arts